The 1999 TranSouth Financial 400 was the fifth stock car race of the 1999 NASCAR Winston Cup Series season and the 43rd iteration of the event. The race was held on Sunday, March 21, 1999, before an audience of 71,000 in Darlington, South Carolina, at Darlington Raceway, a  permanent egg-shaped oval racetrack. The race was shortened from its scheduled 293 laps to 164 due to rain. In the final laps of the race, a wreck involving five cars, including the leader at the time, Roush Racing driver Jeff Burton would occur in the midst of rain on lap 163. Despite major damage to his car, Burton would manage to keep up with pace car speed and when the race was stopped a lap later due to increasing rain, NASCAR decided to let the race end due to a lack of sunlight. The victory was Burton's seventh career NASCAR Winston Cup Series victory and his second victory of the season. To fill out the top three, Penske-Kranefuss Racing driver Jeremy Mayfield and Hendrick Motorsports driver Jeff Gordon would finish second and third, respectively.

Background 

Darlington Raceway is a race track built for NASCAR racing located near Darlington, South Carolina. It is nicknamed "The Lady in Black" and "The Track Too Tough to Tame" by many NASCAR fans and drivers and advertised as "A NASCAR Tradition." It is of a unique, somewhat egg-shaped design, an oval with the ends of very different configurations, a condition which supposedly arose from the proximity of one end of the track to a minnow pond the owner refused to relocate. This situation makes it very challenging for the crews to set up their cars' handling in a way that is effective at both ends.

Entry list 

 (R) denotes rookie driver.

Practice

First practice 
The first practice session was held on Friday, March 19, at 11:00 AM EST. The session would last for one hour and 15 minutes.

Second practice 
The second practice session was held on Friday, March 19, at 1:00 PM EST. The session would last for 55 minutes.

Final practice 
The final practice session, sometimes referred to as Happy Hour, was held on Saturday, March 20, after the preliminary 1999 Diamond Hill Plywood 200 NASCAR Busch Series race. The session would last for one hour.

Qualifying 
Qualifying was split into two rounds. The first round was held on Friday, March 19, at 3:30 PM EST. Each driver would have one lap to set a time. During the first round, the top 25 drivers in the round would be guaranteed a starting spot in the race. If a driver was not able to guarantee a spot in the first round, they had the option to scrub their time from the first round and try and run a faster lap time in a second round qualifying run, held on Saturday, March 20, at 11:30 AM EST. As with the first round, each driver would have one lap to set a time. Positions 26-36 would be decided on time, while positions 37-43 would be based on provisionals. Six spots are awarded by the use of provisionals based on owner's points. The seventh is awarded to a past champion who has not otherwise qualified for the race. If no past champion needs the provisional, the next team in the owner points will be awarded a provisional.

Three drivers would fail to qualify.

Full qualifying results

Race results

References

TransSouth Financial 400
TransSouth Financial 400
NASCAR races at Darlington Raceway
March 1999 sports events in the United States